Puha hebes is an extinct species of sea snail, a marine gastropod mollusk in the family Raphitomidae.

Description
(Original description) The shell is ovato-fusiform with a blunt spire. The whorls are rather angled and distantly spirally striated. The shell shows a spiral row of nodules along the keel. Above the keel it is smooth. The body whorl is larger than the spire. The siphonal canal has a moderate length.

Distribution
Fossils of this marine species were found in New Zealand off Oamaru.

References

 Maxwell, P.A. (2009). Cenozoic Mollusca. Pp 232-254 in Gordon, D.P. (ed.) New Zealand inventory of biodiversity. Volume one. Kingdom Animalia: Radiata, Lophotrochozoa, Deuterostomia. Canterbury University Press, Christchurch.

External links
 

hebes
Gastropods described in 1873
Gastropods of New Zealand